Chahuk-e Mehrab (also Romanized as Chāhūk-e Meḩrāb) is a small village in Bazman Rural District, Bazman District, Iranshahr County, Sistan and Baluchestan Province, Iran. As of the 2006 Census of the Islamic Republic of Iran, the village's population was 33 and contained 9 families.

References 

Populated places in Iranshahr County